Dharmapur Union may refer to the following unions in Bangladesh:

 Dharmapur Union, Noakhali, Noakhali District
 Dharmapur Union, Fatikchhari, Chittagong District
 Dharmapur Union, Feni, Feni District
 Dharmapur Union, Satkania, Satkania Upazila, Chittagong District
 Dharmapur Union, Birol, Dinajpur District, Bangladesh